"Baby, Walk On" is a song originally recorded by American country music singer Matraca Berg. It was her first single release, and it appears on her 1990 debut album Lying to the Moon. A second version, titled just "Walk On", was released by Linda Ronstadt in 1995.

History
As with most of the tracks on Lying to the Moon, Berg wrote the song with Ronnie Samoset, with Josh Leo and Wendy Waldman as producers. Instead of a B-side, the commercial single release featured three snippets from the album. Berg's version was also the B-side of her 1991 single "It's Easy to Tell".

Critical reception
Kimmy Wix of Cash Box reviewed Berg's version with favor, stating that "an energy-boosting time that says 'If you're gonna walk, take big steps!'" and that it "not only flaunts Berg's driving vocals, but gives us a tune full of deep-boppin' music, as well as a message with which we can easily
relate."

Linda Ronstadt version
Linda Ronstadt also covered the song as just "Walk On" on her 1995 album Feels Like Home for Elektra Records, with Alison Krauss on backing vocals. Ronstadt's version also charted in 1995, with "The Waiting" on the B-side.

A review in Billboard of Ronstadt's version was favorable, stating that it "gives this progenitor a chance to fully strut her vocal stuff."

Chart performance

Matraca Berg

Linda Ronstadt

References

1990 songs
1990 debut singles
1995 singles
Linda Ronstadt songs
Matraca Berg songs
Songs written by Matraca Berg
Songs written by Ronnie Samoset
Song recordings produced by Josh Leo
Elektra Records singles
RCA Records Nashville singles